Mashayekh Rural District may refer to:
 Mashayekh Rural District (Chaharmahal and Bakhtiari Province)
 Mashayekh Rural District (Fars Province)